The Supreme Soviet of the Kazakh SSR, also known as the Supreme Council was a unicameral legislative branch of the Kazakh SSR, one of the republics comprising the Soviet Union. The Soviet had very little  power and carried out orders given by the Communist Party of Kazakhstan (CPK).

Chairman

Chairmen of the Presidium of the Supreme Soviet of the Kazakh SSR
The office Chairmen of the Presidium of the Supreme Soviet is the de facto head of state of the Kazakh SSR.
 Abdisamet Kazakpaev (July 17, 1938 – January 1947)
 Ivan Lukyanets (January 1947 – March 20, 1947)
 Daniyal Kerimbaev (March 20, 1947 – January 23, 1954)
 Nurtas Undasynov (January 23, 1954 – April 19, 1955)
 Zhumabek Tashenev (April 19, 1955 – January 20, 1960)
 Fazyl Karibzhanov (January 20, 1960 – August 25, 1960)
 Kapitolina Kryukova (August 25, 1960 – January 3, 1961)
 Isagali Sharipov (January 3, 1961 – April 5, 1965)
 Sabir Niyazbekov (April 5, 1965 – December 20, 1978)
 Isatai Abdukarimov (December 20, 1978 – December 14, 1979)
 Sattar Imashev (December 14, 1979 – February 22, 1984)
 Andrei Plotnikov (February 22, 1984 – March 22, 1984)
 Baiken Ashimov (March 22, 1984 – September 27, 1985)
 Salamat Mukashev (September 27, 1985 – February 9, 1988)
 Zakash Kamalidenov (February 9, 1988 – December 1988)
 Vera Sidorova (December 1988 – March 10, 1989)
 Mahtay Sagdiev (March 10, 1989 – February 22, 1990)

Chairmen of the Supreme Soviet of the Kazakh SSR
 Kiylybay Medeubekov (December 13, 1979 – February 22, 1990)
 Nursultan Nazarbayev (February 22 – April 24, 1990)
 Yerik Asanbayev (April 24, 1990 – October 16, 1991)

Chairmen of the Supreme Soviet of the Kazakhstan
 Serikbolsyn Abdildin (October 16, 1991 – January 28, 1993)

Convocations 
 1st convocation (1938–1946)
 2nd convocation (1947–1950)
 3rd convocation (1951–1954)
 4th convocation (1955–1959)
 5th convocation (1959–1962)
 6th convocation (1963–1966)
 7th convocation (1967–1970)
 8th convocation (1971–1974)
 9th convocation (1975–1979)
 10th convocation (1980–1984)
 11th convocation (1985–1989)
 12th convocation (1990–1993)

References 

1937 establishments in the Kazakh Soviet Socialist Republic
1993 disestablishments in Kazakhstan
Kazakh Soviet Socialist Republic
Defunct unicameral legislatures
Kazakh